These are the results of the 2010 United Kingdom general election in Wales. The election was held on 6 May 2010, and all 40 parliamentary seats in Wales were contested. The Labour Party remained the party with the most seats in Wales, however it suffered a net loss of 4 seats and its share of the vote dropped by 6.5%. The Conservatives increased their number of seats by 5 and the Liberal Democrats and Plaid Cymru saw little change both in the number of seats and share of the vote.

Despite the Labour party winning the most votes in Wales, the Conservatives won across the UK.

Results

References

Wales
United Kingdom General Election Results in Wales, 2010
2010s elections in Wales
General elections in Wales to the Parliament of the United Kingdom